Livingston was a constituency of the Scottish Parliament (Holyrood). It elected one Member of the Scottish Parliament (MSP) by the plurality (first past the post) method of election.

For the 2011 Scottish Parliament election, Livingston was expanded and renamed Almond Valley

Electoral region 
See also Lothians (Scottish Parliament electoral region)

Constituency boundaries and council area 

The Livingston constituency was created at the same time as the Scottish Parliament, in 1999, with the name and boundaries of an  existing Westminster constituency. In 2005, however, Scottish Westminster (House of Commons) constituencies were mostly replaced with new constituencies.

Boundary review 

 See Scottish Parliament constituencies and regions from 2011 

Following their First Periodic review of constituencies to the Scottish Parliament in time for the 2011 elections, the Boundary Commission for Scotland recommended alterations to the existing Livingston and Linlithgow constituencies.

Livingston was effectively abolished, replaced by a newly formed Almond Valley seat. This constituency takes in the Livingston, East Calder, Fauldhouse, Breich Valley, and Seafield areas. A newly shaped Linlithgow constituency was formed from the Linlithgow, Broxburn, Blackburn, Whitburn, and Armadale areas.

Member of the Scottish Parliament

Election results

References 

Scottish Parliament constituencies and regions 1999–2011
1999 establishments in Scotland
Constituencies established in 1999
2011 disestablishments in Scotland
Constituencies disestablished in 2011
Politics of West Lothian
Livingston, West Lothian
Broxburn, West Lothian